Jason White (born November 11, 1973) is an American musician, best known for being the touring guitarist of the rock band Green Day. He has performed with Green Day as a touring member since 1997.  He has worked with Green Day in the studio and on tour, and has appeared in various music videos with the band, including "When I Come Around", "Wake Me Up When September Ends" and "Last of the American Girls".  He was briefly credited as an official member on the group's 2012 trilogy ¡Uno!, ¡Dos!, and ¡Tré!.  Prior to working with Green Day, he was a member of the punk band Pinhead Gunpowder, which also featured Green Day vocalist Billie Joe Armstrong.  White has also been a member of a number of Green Day side projects including Foxboro Hot Tubs, The Network, and The Coverups among others.

Career

Other musical acts (1992–present) 

In the summer of 1992, White filled in guitar duties at the last minute for Bay Area punk band Monsula, who were performing at Little Rock, AR club Vino's. After the performance, Jason toured as guitarist for the band and eventually relocated to the Bay Area after the breakup of Chino Horde in summer 1993. White joined the Big Cats in 1996, after the temporary departure of bassist Josh Bentley, and took over guitar duties in 2000 after the death of guitarist Shannon Yarbrough. The group is a side project of many musicians, playing live very rarely. Their newest record, On Tomorrow, was released in 2007.

Because of Pinhead Gunpowder's infamy for sporadic get-togethers, White and Gunpowder bassist Bill Schneider began looking to form another band that would be a group the two could focus on. After recruiting Schneider's brother Greg Schneider to join and finally convincing Willie Samuels to play drums, The Influents were formed. White and Greg would become the focus of the band, splitting songwriting duties, as well as singing time. Bill Schneider left the band on good terms after the group's first album Check Please to focus on his drum shop and was soon replaced by Johnnie Wentz. The new line-up soon recorded a follow up, Some of the Young, and went on tour.

In 2006, Jason recorded a cover of The Replacements "Torture" for the Replacements Cover compilation, "We'll Inherit the Earth". He's also featured in the May 2007 release, Towncraft, a documentary covering twenty years of the punk music scene in Little Rock, AR, White's home. That same year, White played with Green Day in the video for the cover of "Working Class Hero."

Green Day and related work (1994–present) 

As a friend of punk rock trio Green Day, he appeared in the "When I Come Around" video, where he is seen kissing a girl (his real-life girlfriend at the time). In 1994, White joined punk quartet Pinhead Gunpowder after the departure of singer/guitarist Sarah Kirsch (with whom White had played the previous year in Sixteen Bullets). When Green Day/Pinhead Gunpowder lead singer Billie Joe Armstrong founded Adeline Records in 1997, White helped him run it. He re-appeared with Armstrong for two Green Day shows in 1999, both of which raised money for the Bridge School Benefit.

With the release of American Idiot, White was required again to play with the band during the supporting tour of the album. In February 2005, Jason got married. That year, he played with Green Day in their video, "Wake Me Up When September Ends"—the first time that any musician outside the trio appeared as a performer in a Green Day video. He also appears along the band in their 2005 live CD/DVD Bullet in a Bible. In April 2007, White and his wife joined Armstrong and his family in their Spring Break working with Habitat For Humanity and writing a diary for fan site GreenDay.net.

In 2008, White joined Green Day's side project Foxboro Hot Tubs as lead guitarist along with Kevin Preston of Prima Donna on rhythm guitar. In 2009, he toured with Green Day in support for their latest record, 21st Century Breakdown. White made his fourth appearance on a Green Day video for "21 Guns" and his fifth in "Last of the American Girls"; prior to this, and not including his live appearances on "Jesus of Suburbia" and "East Jesus Nowhere", he had appeared in three videos: "When I Come Around", "Wake Me Up When September Ends", and "Working Class Hero".

On July 13, 2010, Max Recordings released White's debut 45 single—"Hungover" b/w "I'm a Mess". He appeared once again as Green Day's sideman for their 2011 live album Awesome as Fuck. White is credited with contributing "Guitar" in the press release of Green Day's ninth, tenth, and eleventh studio albums ¡Uno!, ¡Dos!, and ¡Tré! and also appeared in the music video for "Oh Love". In addition, he appears in photographs with the band. He was not inducted into the Rock and Roll Hall of Fame in 2015. In 2016, White reverted to being a touring member of Green Day, and the band recorded their twelfth studio album Revolution Radio as the classic three-piece lineup. White played guitar on the song "Back in the USA" on Green Day's 2017 compilation Greatest Hits: God's Favorite Band as an additional musician.

Personal life 
In 2005, White married Janna Rollins. Their only child and son Sonny was born on February 1, 2013.

In late 2014, he was diagnosed with tonsil cancer, which has since been treated.

Associated acts 
Numbskulz (guitar, 1988)
Step by Step (vocals, 1989–1990)
Chino Horde (bass, 1990–1993)
Fishwagon (guitar/vocals, 1991)
Monsula (guitar, 1992–1993)
Sixteen Bullets (bass, 1994)
Pinhead Gunpowder (guitar/vocals, 1995–present)
The Big Cats (vocals, 1996–1997, 2000–present; bass, 1996–1997; guitar, 2000–present)
The Influents (guitar/vocals, 1999–2003)
The Network (credited as Balducci, guitar, 2003–2005, 2020–2021)
Foxboro Hot Tubs (guitar, 2007–present)
 Green Day (lead guitar, backing vocals: 1999–2012, 2016–present (touring member); 2012–2016 (official member)
California (guitar/vocals, 2014–present)
The Coverups (guitar/vocals, 2018–present)

References

External links 

Profile on Max Recordings

1973 births
Living people
American punk rock guitarists
American punk rock musicians
Green Day members
Lead guitarists
Little Rock Central High School alumni
Musicians from Little Rock, Arkansas
Guitarists from Arkansas
American male guitarists
Rhythm guitarists